Sherron Watkins (born August 28, 1959) is an American former Vice President of Corporate Development at the Enron Corporation. Watkins was called to testify before committees of the U.S. House of Representatives and Senate at the beginning of 2002, primarily about her warnings to Enron's then-CEO Kenneth Lay about accounting irregularities in the financial statements.

In August 2001, Watkins alerted Lay of accounting irregularities in financial reports. However, Watkins has been criticized for not reporting the fraud to government authorities and not speaking up publicly sooner about her concerns, as her memo did not reach the public until five months after it was written. Watkins was represented by Houston attorney Philip H. Hilder.

Watkins was selected as one of three "Persons of the Year 2002" by Time magazine, alongside two other whistleblowers, Cynthia Cooper of WorldCom and Coleen Rowley of the FBI.

Early life and education
Watkins was born in Tomball, Texas. Watkins holds a Bachelor of Business Administration (with honors) from the University of Texas, where she was a member of Alpha Chi Omega sorority, and a Master in Professional Accounting, also from the McCombs School of Business. Watkins is a Certified Public Accountant.

Career
Watkins began her career in 1982 at Arthur Andersen as an auditor. She spent eight years at Andersen in both the Houston and New York offices. She joined New York-based MG Trade Finance in 1990 to manage their portfolio of commodity-backed finance assets until October 1993.

She joined Enron in 1993, and departed in November 2002. Since then, Watkins has been giving speeches at colleges and management congresses.

In 2004, she released a book about her experiences at Enron and the problems of US corporate culture, Power Failure: The Inside Story of the Collapse of Enron.

Books
Mimi Swartz with Sherron Watkins: Power Failure. The Inside Story of The Collapse of Enron,  (March 2003)

Film
 Enron: The Smartest Guys in the Room. 2005. IMDB Includes personal interviews with Sherron Watkins.
 The Crooked E: The Unshredded Truth About Enron. 2003. Portrayed as a staff accountant who nervously alerts Lay of the misstatements.

References

External links
Sherron Watkins - Official Website
Sherronwatkins.com(archived version at the Wayback Machine, from January 28, 2017)
Sherron Watkins email to Enron Chairman Kenneth Lay, August 2001

1959 births
American accountants
American energy industry executives
American whistleblowers
Enron people
Living people
McCombs School of Business alumni
Women in finance
People from Tomball, Texas